Tales of Xillia is a Japanese role-playing game released for the PlayStation 3 on September 7, 2011, in Japan. The game was localized in North America on August 6, 2013, and Europe on August 9, 2013. Its sequel Tales of Xillia 2 was released on November 1, 2012. The protagonists in Tales of Xillia are designed by Mutsumi Inomata and Kōsuke Fujishima. The new protagonist, Ludger Will Kresnik, in Tales of Xillia 2 is designed by Daigo Okumura. After the events of Tales of Xillia, Rieze Maxia is united under one ruler and the barrier separating Rieze Maxia and Elympios no longer exists, allowing the two sides to start diplomatic relations and trading.

In Tales of Xillia, Jude Mathis meets and accompanies Milla Maxwell who intends to destroy a weapon called the Lance of Kresnik due to it being powered by a spyrix; a power source which absorbs spirits to create power. Tales of Xillia 2 takes place a year later and follows Ludger Will Kresnik who is hired by Spirius Corporation to destroy parallel dimensions because the spirit Origin is unable to sustain the abundance of souls. In order to destroy alternative universes, he must destroy the divergence catalyst which can reside within the object or living being whom caused a point of divergence.

Creation and conception
Mutsumi Inomata and Kōsuke Fujishima were the character designers of Tales of Xillia. They were each given characters which played to their strengths. During development, an old woman design was considered but dropped. For the antagonists, the development team gave them motives that were equally sound to the protagonists. During the development of Tales of Xillia, the developers intended the players to recruit Gaius and antagonist Muzét or vice versa; the idea was dropped due to time constraints. Since both artists had different sizes for their character's anatomy in the concept art, the in-game models were rescaled for consistency.

In Tales of Xillia 2, a new protagonist was needed because the game would focus on Elympios instead of Rieze Maxia. Meanwhile, the returning protagonists from Tales of Xillia received redesigns to match what the citizens of Elympios would wear. Daigo Okumura was in charge of designing the new main characters and redesigning the returning ones. Okumura stated he conceived and designed the characters using his computer.

Protagonists

Jude Mathis
Voiced by (English): Sam RiegelVoiced by (Japanese): Tsubasa Yonaga
 is a medical student who excels in martial arts. By the events of Tales of Xillia 2, Jude becomes a spyrite researcher in Elympios. He is designed by Kōsuke Fujishima who wanted Jude to start off as meek and timid who matures towards the end of the game; To complement this, Jude's voice actor was instructed to portray him as a passive party leader. Since his debut, Jude ranked on the Tales character popularity polls. He appears in Tales of the Heroes: Twin Brave as a playable character.

Milla Maxwell
Voiced by (English): Minae NojiVoiced by (Japanese): Miyuki Sawashiro
 is the successor to Maxwell, the master of spirits. In Tales of Xillia 2, the protagonists are joined by Milla from a parallel universe in which Milla did not succeed Maxwell and lives as a normal human. She is pulled into the prime dimension by Elle after the party destroys her dimension. During the events of the game, the alternate Milla disappears out of existence upon meeting the real Milla.

Mutsumi Inomata was chosen to design Milla due to her strength in designing cool women. Inomata stated Milla's hair was the most difficult part to design and was adjusted multiple times during development. The development team wanted Milla to be devoid of feminine feelings but were overruled by the female staff. Since her debut, Milla ranked on the Tales character popularity polls. She appears in Tales of the Heroes: Twin Brave as a playable character.

Alvin
Voiced by (English): Matthew MercerVoiced by (Japanese): Tomokazu Sugita
, full name , is the heir of the Svent family. Alvin's family was aboard a cruise ship when it became trapped in Rieze Maxia and resulted in his father's death. His uncle, Gilland, forced his mother,  into a sexual relationship resulting in Alvin's distrust in others. Leticia becomes bedridden forcing Alvin to work with Exodus in order to sustain her life with medicine; she dies during the events of Tales of Xillia leaving Alvin to contemplate his place in the world. Initially, Alvin joins the party to spy on them for Exodus but decides he belongs with them as the plot progresses.

Alvin is designed by Kōsuke Fujishima. Fujishima stated Alvin's design was easy to conceive though the color of his scarf was hard to decide on. The writers wanted Alvin's intention to betray the party to be obvious to incite the player's curiosity on his motives. Alvin's personality is the personification of Jude's adult personality if the events of Tales of Xillia did not occur. Since his debut, Alvin ranked on the Tales character popularity polls.

Elize Lutus
Voiced by (English): Karen Strassman (Elize), Erin Fitzgerald (Teepo)Voiced by (Japanese): Yuki Horinaka (Elize), Haruna Ikezawa (Teepo)
 is a young girl whose parents were killed for harboring Jiao. Since then, she was forcefully experimented on and was given a device called a Booster which augments her magical abilities. After the lab's closure, she is taken in by Jiao and chooses to leave his care to be with the party. After the events of Tales of Xillia, Elize is able to live a normal life under her caretaker and friend, Driselle Sharil.

She is designed by Kōsuke Fujishima for his specialty in designing young girls. Elize was the last character to be created since the development team felt having a young kid fight would conflict with the serious atmosphere. Teepo was created to be Elize's partner as a result. Since her debut, Elize ranked on the Tales character popularity polls.

Rowen J. Illbert
Voiced by (English): Todd HaberkornVoiced by (Japanese): Mugihito
 was a legendary tactician for the Rashugal military and friends with Nachtigal before his kingship. Rowen retires and becomes the butler to the Sharil family and joins the party in Tales of Xillia to stop Nachtigal's corrupt reign. By the events of Tales of Xillia 2, Rowen has since become prime minister of Rieze Maxia alongside Gaius. Designed by Mutsumi Inomata, Rowen's role was conceived to be a mentor to the party. The writers wanted Rowen to have the air of a retired soldier. Since his debut, Rowen ranked on the Tales character popularity polls.

Leia Rolando
Voiced by (English): Lauren LandaVoiced by (Japanese): Saori Hayami
 is Jude's childhood friend and a nurse who works for the Mathis family clinic. After the events of Tales of Xillia Leia quits as a nurse in order to find a career she is passionate in; she becomes a journalist during the events of Tales of Xillia 2. Designed by Mutsumi Inomata, her cheerful personality was chosen to balance the party's serious atmosphere. Since her debut, Leia ranked on the Tales character popularity polls.

Gaius
Voiced by: Ryōtarō Okiayu
, birth name Erston Outway, is the king of Auj Oule, one of the two countries in Rieze Maxia. Before his reign as king, Auj Oule was divided and controlled by tribes whose leadership were succeeded by bloodline. After Gaius' tribe was destroyed due to an incompetent leader, Gaius decided to unite Auj Oule by conquest and promote a new system of government where competent leaders would rule. Gaius' intention to destroy all spyrixes conflicted with the party's intention to transition spyrixes to spyrite. After the events of Tales of Xillia, Gaius concedes to the party's wishes and unites Rieze Maxia as a single country. During Tales of Xillia 2, Gaius poses as a civilian by using his birth name to investigate public opinion in Elympios; he joins the party to help save the world.

He is designed by Mutsumi Inomata and was given a realist personality to contend with Jude's naive and idealistic personality. Since his debut, Gaius ranked on the Tales character popularity polls.

Muzét
Voiced by (English): Jessica StrausVoiced by (Japanese): Asami Sanada
, designed by Kōsuke Fujishima, is a great spirit and Milla's older sister. In Tales of Xillia, she follows the party during their mission to defeat Exodus and turns against them in order to keep the existence of Rieze Maxia's barrier a secret. She allies herself with Gaius after Maxwell ceases giving her orders. She, along with Gaius, is defeated by the party at the end of Tales of Xillia. In Tales of Xillia 2, a parallel dimension's Muzét served as a divergence catalyst host and is killed by Ludger. The real Muzét joins the party afterwards.

Ludger Will Kresnik
Voiced by (English): Josh GrelleVoiced by (Japanese): Takashi Kondō
 is the main protagonist of Tales of Xillia 2. While a silent protagonist of the game, he speaks in the related radio dramas. He lives with his older half-brother, Julius, and their pet cat, Rollo. He meets Elle Mel Marta during a train hijack by Exodus. After the train crashes and Spirius Corporation treats his injuries, he becomes burdened with a huge debt. Spirius then hires Ludger for his Chromatus power, a power passed down by bloodline, in order to destroy parallel dimensions. In his ending, he becomes President of Spirius Corp and meets Elle's mother. He is designed by Daigo Okumura.

Elle Mel Marta
Voiced by (English): Brina PalenciaVoiced by (Japanese): Mariya Ise
 is an eight-year-old girl from an alternate dimension. Her father, Victor, sends her off to the prime dimension to meet Ludger and to search for the Land of Canaan. Elle is a Key of Kresnik which allows her to travel and take objects from the parallel dimension to the prime dimension. In her ending, she is shown as an adult living her life and continuing to remember Ludger as she still carries his pocketwatch.

Antagonists

Exodus
It is led by Gilland  whose motive is greed and fame. Gilland manipulated Nachtigal, the king of Rashugal, into building the Lance of Kresnik. After the death of Gilland, Exodus falls apart without a leader. Exodus returns in Tales of Xillia 2 where they cause several terrorist acts in order to prevent peace negotiations between Rieze Maxia and Elympios.

Chimeriad

It consists of Jiao, Wingul, Agria, and Presa.

Jiao
Voiced by (English): Patrick SeitzVoiced by (Japanese): Ryūzaburō Ōtomo
 was a wanted criminal who was sheltered by Elize's parents. As a result, her parents were killed and Jiao fled, leaving Elize behind. Because of this, Jiao feels indebted to Elize. Jiao is killed during the Elympios invasion to let the party escape. In Tales of Xillia 2, a parallel dimension Jiao took Elize with him instead of fleeing on his own. He is the divergence catalyst of his dimension and is killed by the party.

Wingul 
Voiced by (English): Kaiji TangVoiced by (Japanese): Hidenobu Kiuchi
 was the leader of a tribe that opposed Gaius' plan on unifying Auj Oule. Realizing Gaius' potential as a peaceful king, Wingul joined Gaius' revolution. He died from overexerting his powers while trying to prevent the party from interfering with Gaius' plans. In a parallel dimension in Tales of Xillia 2, Gaius' sister, Karla, committed suicide causing Gaius to run away and Wingul to become king. He becomes a divergence catalyst host and is killed by the party as a result. Wingul's native language is a modified form of the fictional language in Tales of Eternia.

Agria 
Voiced by: Maaya Sakamoto
 was a Rashugal noble originally named Nadia Travis until she was stripped of her nobility by her stepmother. Agria began a streak of murdering nobles until she was recruited by Presa. Agria died along with Presa during confrontation with the party. In a parallel dimension in Tales of Xillia 2, Leia saved Agria's life and the two became friends, often helping Leia out with her scoops in this dimension.

Presa 
Voiced by: Rina Satō
's parents were Rashugal spies who abandoned her when they were discovered by the government. Presa then trained to be a spy for Auj Oule and falls in love with Alvin while undercover. When Presa reveals her mission to him, Alvin betrayed her resulting in the deaths of her comrades. She is killed along with Agria during a confrontation with the party. Alvin attempts to save her but can not reach her in time. After King Gaius is defeated Alvin builds a grave for her. In a parallel dimension, she is engaged to Alvin.

Spirius Corporation
Spirius has a secret department, the Department of Other Dimension Affairs (DODA), dedicated to reducing the numbers of parallel dimensions in order to prolong the existence of life. It is headed by  who is Ludger and Julius' father. Bisley is voiced by Tsutomu Isobe.

Rideaux
Voiced by: Koji Yusa
 is a doctor from Spirius Corporation who saved Ludger and Elle's life and put Ludger in debt. Though a member of the Kresnik bloodline, he was born into poverty as a sickly child destined to die. Derrick Mathis saved his life by replacing some of his internal organs with Medical Spyrix. Rideaux took on shady work to get money to pay for his treatment that his family could not afford, until Bisley realised he was a Chromatus user and took Rideaux in to work for him. Rideaux's life is ultimately used by Bisley so that he could enter the Land of Cannan.

Victor
 is Ludger from a parallel dimension and is the father of the Elle seen in Tales of Xillia 2; Victor is the title awarded to the strongest Spirius Agent. His life followed closely to the prime Ludger's until Elle's death upon her return to her home dimension. When his daughter was born, Jude and his companions decided to use Elle to have the prime dimension spare them; in response Victor killed them and became his dimension's divergence catalyst and a Waymarker. Victor then plotted to have himself and Elle be reborn in the prime dimension by using his daughter to bring the prime Ludger to him; he is overpowered and killed by Ludger.

Chronos
Voiced by (English): Joel McDonaldVoiced by: (Japanese) Junichi Suwabe
 is one of the three original spirits and is the master of spacetime. Chronos was the one who gave the Kresnik bloodline their Chromatus powers. Over the course of Tales of Xillia 2, he serves as the arbiter of Origin's examination of human worth, but quickly shows himself to be extremely biased against humans, viewing them as greedy, warlike parasites.

Supporting characters

Ivar
Voiced by (English): Orion AcabaVoiced by (Japanese): Showtaro Morikubo
 is a shaman in a village that worships Maxwell. He is egotistical, believing he is the only human worthy of Milla's trust. He considers Jude a rival, and acknowledges his own shortcomings during the events of Tales of Xillia. In Tales of Xillia 2, he is employed by Spirius Corporation.

Maxwell
Voiced by: Chikao Ōtsuka
 is one of the three original spirits and is the master of spirits. He was summoned by a human named Milla Kresnik, resulting in his fondness for humans.

Julius Will Kresnik
Voiced by (English): J.Michael TatumVoiced by: (Japanese) Tōru Ōkawa
 is Ludger's older half brother. He begins working for Bisley as a child and kills Ludger's mother during a misunderstanding. After learning about the Kresnik bloodline and Bisley's goals, Julius adopts Ludger, intending to use him for revenge. Ludger's love towards him causes Julius to treat him as a younger brother instead of a tool. Towards the end of Tales of Xillia 2, Julius offers himself as a sacrifice in order to allow the party to travel to the Land of Canaan.

Origin
Voiced by: Aya Endō
 is one of the three original spirits and is tasked with the purification and reincarnation of souls. He arranges a trial to see if humans are worth saving and resides in the Land of Canaan where soul purification occurs.

Reception
Reception towards the characters varied. Edge called the interactions between the characters as well written and engaging and praised how the characters avoided the cliché found in manga and anime. Electronic Gaming Monthly described the characters as rather normal and competent compared to the previous Tales games. PlayStation Official Magazine and Polygon described the characters as following JRPG archetypes and predictable.

Notes and references
Notes

References

Kōsuke Fujishima
Tales of Xillia
Xillia, Tales of